José R. Oubrerie (born November 9, 1932) is a French architect, educator, and author. He was a protégé of Le Corbusier.

Education
Oubrerie studied painting at the Ecole des Beux-Arts (1946–51) in Nantes, and architecture at the 
École Nationale Supérieure des Beaux-Arts (ENSBA), (1955-58/ 1966–68) in Paris, France. Since 1970, Oubrerie is registered in the Ordre des Architect, Paris, France, and an American Institute of Architects honorary member.

Projects 
 Église Saint-Pierre with Le Corbusier; 1960–70, 1970–78, 2003–06 (completed)
 Miller House, Lexington, Kentucky
 French Cultural Center, Damascus, Syria; 1988 (completed)
 Centre Le Corbusier, Zurich, Switzerland; 1963–1967 (completed) with Le Corbusier, G. Jullian, et al.

Academic career
Oubrerie is professor emeritus at Austin E. Knowlton School of Architecture at Ohio State University, having held the position of chair of the architecture department (1991–97) and professor of architecture. Oubrerie is also a visiting professor at the School of Architecture at the University of Illinois at Chicago. From 1987 to 1991, Oubrerie was dean at University of Kentucky College of Design, formerly College of Architecture, in Lexington, Kentucky, where he also taught as a professor of architecture (1980–81, 1983–4). Previously, Oubrerie taught architectural design as assistant professor at New York Institute of Technology (1985–87), Columbia University Graduate School of Architecture, Planning and Preservation (1985–87), and Irwin S. Chanin School of Architecture of Cooper Union (1974) in New York City, as well as Polytechnic University of Milan (1981–83) and Ecole Nationale Superieure des Beux-Arts (1974–84), Paris.

Awards, honors 
 2002 Lumley Research Award, The College of Engineering, Ohio State University

Exhibitions 
 2007/ 2008, L'Eglise Saint-Pierre de Firminy-Vert. John Hartell Gallery, AAP, Cornell University; Wexner Center for the Arts, Ohio State University

Publications 
"L'Oriente di Jeanneret", Parametro, 1986,143, G. Gresleri, L. Benevolo, G. Trebbi, P. L. Cervellati, L. M. Colli, I. Zannier, C. de Seta, J. Oubrerie, E. Masi, K. Frampton, pp. 1–1, 6–64
Oubrerie, José, 2015, Architecture With And Without Le Corbusier: Jose Oubrerie Architect. Oscar Riera Ojeda Publishers,

References

External links
 

20th-century French architects
Ohio State University faculty
Living people
1932 births
Architects from Nantes